Cristina Perincioli (born November 11, 1946, in Bern, Switzerland) is a Swiss film director, writer, multimedia producer and webauthor. She moved to Berlin in 1968. Since 2003 she has lived Stücken in Brandenburg.

Life and career
Cristina Perincioli was born in Bern, as third child of the renowned sculptor Marcel Perincioli and his wife Hélène Perincioli-Jörns, a Handweaving Artist. She is the granddaughter of the bernese Sculptor Etienne Perincioli. In 1968, Cristina Perincioli moved to Berlin to study at the Deutsche Film- und Fernsehakademie Berlin (dffb – German Film and Television Academy). This motivated her to documentary films (Nixon in Berlin, Occupation of a Student Residence, Kreuzberg is Ours, Population Explosion) and feature films. Her docufiction about a women's strike, For Women: Chapter 1, from 1971 is one of the first contributions to Women's cinema in West Germany; the film won the "Award of the Film Journalists" at the International Short Film Festival Oberhausen 1972. Harun Farocki writes: "You can see how much fun liberating knowledge can be."

In 1969 she was active in the anarchist journal agit 883, co-founder of both the Lesbian movement in 1972 and 1973 of the first "Women's Center", and 1977 of the "Rape Crisis Center”, all in (West-)Berlin. In 1975 she wrote with her partner Cäcilia Rentmeister the screenplay for the first feature film about a lesbian relationship produced for German television ("Anna and Edith", ZDF/Second German TV Channel).

In 1977 Perincioli founded the Sphinx Filmproduktion GmbH, with Marianne Gassner as a production manager. The documentary fiction The Power of Men is the Patience of Women (ZDF/ Second German TV Channel, 1978) is also shown internationally. From an interview with Perincioli:
"When in 1974 I saw the first shelters for battered wives in England, I started in Berlin to interview women about domestic violence and found an unsuspected level of abuse. We – women from the women's movement and committed journalists – began from now on, to mobilize the public by radio and television broadcasts and by the book 'Violence in Marriage'. 1976 the first women's shelter opened in (West-)Berlin. In 1978 we shot this film together with women from the shelter, acting their own experiences. Internationally successful, the film supported the women's shelter movement in Germany, Australia, Canada, the US, Switzerland, Austria, Sweden and India. The title became a slogan."

Michael Althen described 2008 in the Frankfurter Allgemeine Zeitung functions and effects of the film as a "... documentary fiction in which residents of Berlin's first women's shelter replay and comment their experiences with domestic violence. It's not about an individual fate, but about recurring patterns of violence and regret on men's side, about guilt and shame on women's side, about humiliating experiences in offices and the whole vicious circles of social and emotional dependencies. The film is strongest when articulating the silence of the social environment and lack of moral courage."

Perincioli published as radio- and book author. Inspired by research in London and Harrisburg, US, she contributed to the public debate and awareness about domestic violence and about the risks of nuclear energy.

From 1990 she developed interactive storytelling, and on this basis, a first adventure game with interactive video (1992), and created seven computer serious games for the public space ("Loud is Out", "Oh, the Few Drops", "Female, Male – and In-Between", "Culture Tester Rebellion")

She has taught film production at KIMC Kenya Institute of Mass Communication in Nairobi and the Universität der Künste Berlin, Computer Animation at the Deutsche Film- und Fernsehakademie Berlin (dffb – German Film and Television Academy), the Film School in Potsdam-Babelsberg and the Merz Academy of Art and Design Stuttgart, and Multimedia Design at the School of Design in Bern and Basel until 1997.

From the late 1990s on, Perincioli ventured to use interactive media for "sensitive issues" such as sexual and domestic violence; she created – employing user-friendly methods such as Discovery learning – award-winning web platforms for understanding, counselling and preventing violence, funded by the German Federal Environmental Foundation, the Foundation Deutsche Jugendmarke, the Daphne Programme of the European Commission and the German Federal Ministry for Family Affairs, Senior Citizens, Women and Youth.

In 2015, Cristina Perincioli's new book Berlin wird feministisch. Das Beste, was von der 68er Bewegung blieb (Berlin Goes Feminist. Anarchism - Lesbianism - Feminism) was published in Germany.
 
She describes the beginnings of the German second women ́s movement in the revolutionary years 1968–1974 in West Berlin. 
Through a wealth of documents, 80 photographs, reflections and interviews with 28 feminist activists, she shows where she and her fellow campaigners drew their ideas from, as well as the fury and strength they needed to put these ideas into practice. Perincioli also considers the beginnings of the women ́s movement as an example of how the modernization of society was initiated by "direct democratic" actions.

According to Sonya Winterberg the book shows that the second German women's movement has "many mothers":  
 "Perincioli...[offers] extensive and highly entertaining insights into the early lesbian and women's movement [...] This undogmatic, grassroots, autonomous and highly creative movement gave rise to vibrant projects, women's centers and lesbian groups, some of which still exist today. When Perincioli writes of the 'best that remained of the 68er movement, it is no exaggeration  [...] Anyone who still believes that Alice Schwarzer was the mother of the new women's and lesbian movement would do well to take a look behind the scenes here."

Claire Horst also emphasizes the new "look behind the scenes":  
 "What a biography! Cristina Perincioli provides a first-hand account of the emergence of the second German women's movement, since she was there from the very beginning [...] And she doesn't ignore the turf wars and conflicts within the movement... [Another thing that makes the biography] well worth reading is the self-critical and often humorous stance the author adopts now, without distancing herself from the aims of the time." Horst also stresses the Berlin setting: "The book can also be read as a cultural history of the alternative Berlin of the 60s and 70s."

An English version of the complete book, translated by Pamela Selwyn, is published online: see "Websites" below.

Awards
1972 Perincioli received the "Award of the Film Journalists" at the International Short Film Festival Oberhausen for her thesis film at the Deutsche Film- und Fernsehakademie Berlin (dffb – German Film and Television Academy) "For Women: Chapter 1". Gwendolyn Audrey Foster writes about her directorial work: "Cristina Perincioli is an important figure in the tradition of Straub, Huillet an Fassbinder ..." (in "Women Film Directors. ... An International Guide" 1995, p. 306). Best rating for the CD-ROM "Save Selma" (Serious Game: prevention for children on the subject of sexual abuse) in Feibel's “Software For Children”-Ratings 1999 and 2000. For her web platform "www.4uman.info" to prevent violence in relationships (in English and German), Perincioli received at the 6th Berlin Crime Prevention Day 2005 the Securitas Award for the "innovative character of the site in violence prevention." Her website www.spass-oder-gewalt.de about prevention of sexual violence among young people in 2007 received the Thuringian Women Media Award.

Works

Film
 Striking my Eyes, Bern/Schweiz (1966)
 Nixon Visit and Highschool Fight (Weekly Newsreel Collective) (1968)
 Occupation and Self-Administration of a Student Residence (with Gisela Tuchtenhagen) (1969)
 For Women: Chapter 1  (writer, director), a Documentary Fiction (1971)
 Kreuzberg is Ours (camera) (1972)
 Women Behind the Camera (co-author) (1972)
 Anna and Edith (book, along with Caecilia Rentmeister), Feature Film, ZDF-TV (1975). Published on DVD by Edition Salzgeber
 The Power of Men is the Patience of Women (writer, director, producer) feature film/documentary fiction, ZDF-TV (1978).  Published on DVD.
 Population Explosion, KIMC Nairobi, Kenya (1985)
 With Woman's Weapons (1986)

Writing (selection)
 Interviews on the topic of "Domestic Violence: Cases of Abuse" (Germany), and reportages and interviews on “Life in the Women´s Shelter in England", in: Sarah Haffner (Ed.): Gewalt in der Ehe, und was Frauen dagegen tun ("Domestic Violence – And What Women Do About It") Wagenbach, Berlin 1976
 Women of Harrisburg, Or: We don't let Us Talk Out of Fear, Rowohlt, Reinbek 1980, further editions 1986, 1991. Total book circulation 20.000.
 Eye and Ear – Computer and Creativity. A Compendium of Computer Graphics, Animation, Music and Video, co-author (Cillie) Cäcilia Rentmeister, DuMont, Cologne 1990
 "From Anarchism and Lesbianism to the Women's Center. Why had the Tomato to Fly so Far?", in: Heinrich Boell Foundation and the Feminist Institute (HGIN): How Far was Flying the Tomato? A Reflective Gala of the Women of 68, Boell, Berlin 1999.
 Berlin wird feministisch. Das Beste, was von der 68er Bewegung blieb, Querverlag, Berlin 2015. See "Websites" for complete English version.

Websites
 feministberlin1968ff.de – Complete English Version of Cristina Perincioli's book Berlin Goes Feminist. Anarchism - Lesbianism - Feminism (Berlin wird feministisch. Das Beste, was von der 68er Bewegung blieb), Berlin 2015
 www.save-selma.de – Exemption strategies from sexual abuse. For young people
 www.gewaltschutz.info – Information for victims of domestic violence and for counselors. Website in seven languages: English, German and five other languages
 www.ava2.de – "Anti Violence Awareness": Information, tools and videos for new methods of intervention in domestic violence, more effective assistance and offender programs, for police, health and social care, councils and women's representatives
 www.4uman.info – Violence in relationships: awareness raising and information for men. In English and German
 www.spass-oder-gewalt.de – Prevention of sexual violence among young people: Learning platform for young people
 www.weiss-die-geiss.de – Tri-national dairy goat Wiki
 www.perincioli.ch – Sculptors Perincioli. 100 Years Life and Works at Berne, Switzerland – Works, Biographies, Records and Reception of Etienne and Marcel Perincioli

See also 
 List of female film and television directors
 List of lesbian filmmakers
 List of LGBT-related films directed by women

References

Further reading
 Gwendolyn Ann Foster, Women Film Directors. An International Bio-Critical Dictionary. Westport, USA 1995, pp. 305–306: article on Cristina Perincioli
 Julia Knight, Women and The New German Cinema, London 1992, article on Cristina Perincioli
 Jutta Phillips, Marc Silberman: If others do not pull out a little power, the film is for the Recycle Bin, in: Aesthetics and Communication, No. 37, Oct. 1979, p. 115 ff

Audiovisual
 Documentary Film about C. Perincioli and U. Sillge, by Anke Schwarz, Sandra (Luka) Stoll und Roman Klarfeld, Das Burlebübele mag I net, Berlin 2008

External links 
Cristina Perincioli personal website

Cristina Perincioli at filmportal.de
Cristina Perincioli in der Deutschen Nationalbibliothek (German National Library)
Cristina Perincioli in: Das Zweitausendeins Filmlexikon, Kategorien "Regie" und "Drehbuch"

1946 births
Living people
German feminists
Mass media people from Berlin
Swiss feminists
Swiss film directors
Swiss women film directors
Lesbian screenwriters
LGBT film directors
Swiss LGBT screenwriters
People from Bern
21st-century LGBT people